Ramildo Dutra de Oliveira (born 27 February 1998), commonly known as Ramildo, is a Brazilian footballer who currently plays as a forward for Flamengo-PI.

Career statistics

Club

Notes

References

1998 births
Living people
Brazilian footballers
Association football forwards
América Futebol Clube (MG) players
Esporte Clube Flamengo players